Chloride channel 7 alpha subunit also known as H+/Cl− exchange transporter 7 is a protein that in humans is encoded by the CLCN7 gene. In melanocytic cells this gene is regulated by the Microphthalmia-associated transcription factor.

Clinical significance

Mutations in the CLCN7 gene have been reported to be associated with autosomal dominant osteopetrosis type II, a rare disease of bones.

See also
 Chloride channel

References

Further reading

External links
  GeneReviews/NCBI/NIH/UW entry on CLCN7-Related Osteopetrosis
 
 

Ion channels